Antonio David Jiménez Pentinel (born 18 February 1977 in Seville) is a Spanish long-distance runner specialising in the steeplechase.

He won the gold medal in the 3000m steeplechase at the 2002 European Athletics Championships in Munich. He was a finalist in the same event at the 2004 Olympics.

Jiménez also finished 5th in the 3000m steeplechase final at the 2006 European Athletics Championships in Gothenburg.

Doping
In March 2014 Jiménez was caught in possession of a prohibited substance and he was subsequently handed a 3-year ban from sports.

Competition record

References

 
 

1977 births
Living people
Athletes (track and field) at the 2004 Summer Olympics
Doping cases in athletics
European Athletics Championships medalists
Olympic athletes of Spain
Spanish male middle-distance runners
Spanish male long-distance runners
Spanish sportspeople in doping cases
Spanish male steeplechase runners
Mediterranean Games gold medalists for Spain
Mediterranean Games silver medalists for Spain
Athletes (track and field) at the 2001 Mediterranean Games
Athletes (track and field) at the 2005 Mediterranean Games
Mediterranean Games medalists in athletics
21st-century Spanish people